An areostationary orbit or areosynchronous equatorial orbit (AEO) is a circular areo­synchronous orbit (ASO) in the Martian equatorial plane about  above the surface, any point on which revolves about Mars in the same direction and with the same period as the Martian surface.  Areo­stationary orbit is a concept similar to Earth's geo­stationary orbit (GEO). The prefix areo- derives from Ares, the ancient Greek god of war and counterpart to the Roman god Mars, with whom the planet was identified. The modern Greek word for Mars is Άρης (Áris).

To date, no artificial satellites have been placed in this orbit, but it is of interest to some scientists foreseeing a future tele­communications network for the exploration of Mars.

Formula 

Orbital speed (how fast a satellite is moving through space) is calculated by multiplying the angular speed of the satellite by the orbital radius:

 
 G = Gravitational constant 
 m2 = Mass of the celestial body
 T = rotational period of the body

By this formula one can find the geostationary-analogous orbit of an object in relation to a given body, in this case, Mars (this type of orbit above is referred to as an areostationary orbit if it is above Mars). 

The mass of Mars being 6.4171×1023 kg and the sidereal period 88,642 seconds. The synchronous orbit thus has a radius of 20,428 km (12693 mi) from the centre of mass of Mars, and therefore areostationary orbit can be defined as approximately 17,032 km above the surface of the Mars equator.

Stationkeeping 
Any satellites in areostationary orbit will suffer from increased orbital station keeping costs,  because the areostationary orbits lie between the orbits of the planet's two natural satellites. Phobos has a semi-major axis of 9,376 km, and Deimos has a semi-major axis of 23,463 km. The close proximity to Phobos' orbit in particular (the larger of the two moons) will cause unwanted orbital resonance effects that will gradually shift the orbit of areostationary satellites.

See also 
 Geostationary orbit
 Areosynchronous orbit
 List of orbits

References

External links 
 Mars Network - Marsats - NASA site devoted to future communications infrastructure for Mars exploration
 Bandwidth available from an areostationary satellite

Mars orbits